Doñinos de Ledesma is a village and municipality in the province of Salamanca, western Spain, part of the autonomous community of Castile and León. It has a population of 68 people.

Geography

See also
List of municipalities in Salamanca

References

Municipalities in the Province of Salamanca